Aditya Music India Private Limited is a music company in India, which owns the label Aditya Music. It produces music for the Telugu cinema industry and is headquartered at Hyderabad, Telangana.

Overview 
The company was founded by Umesh Gupta, initially as a distribution and marketing company for music labels in Andhra Pradesh. In 1996, the label Aditya Music was established, and in 2000 they began manufacturing audio cassettes.

Aditya Music also dubs Telugu movies into Hindi and Bhojpuri.

Soundtrack discography

Telugu cinema 
Swathi Muthyam (1985)
Oke Okkadu (1999)
Thammudu (1999)
Gemini (2002)
Amma Nanna O Tamila Ammayi (2003)
Devullu (2000)
Siva Rama Raju (2002)
Sri Anjaneyam (2004)
Varsham (2004)
Jai Chiranjeeva (2005)
Athadu (2005)
Bangaram (2006)
Stalin (2006)
Sri Ramadasu (2006)
Desamuduru (2007)
Maharathi (2007)
Guru flim (2007)
Pandurangadu (2008)
Magadheera (2009)
Jhummandi Naadam (2010)
Sri Rama Rajyam (2011)
Oosaravelli (2011)
100% Love (2011)
Businessman (2012)Damarukam (2012)Seethamma Vakitlo Sirimalle Chettu (2013)Baadshah (2013)Mukunda (2014)Jai Bolo Telangana (2014)Avatharam (2014)S/O Satyamurthy (2015)Srimanthudu (2015)A Aa (2016)Babu Bangaram (2016)Dhruva (2016)Arjun Reddy (2017)Kaadhali (2017)Raja The Great (2017)DJ: Duvvada Jagannadham (2017)Naa Peru Surya, Naa Illu India (2018)Agnyaathavaasi (2018)Maharshi (2019)Ranarangam (2019)Oh! Baby (2019)Ala Vaikunthapurramuloo (2020)Bheeshma (2020)Uppena (2021)Most Eligible Bachelor (2021)Pushpa: The Rise (2021)Rowdy Boys (2022)Hero (2022)Acharya (2022)Bheemla Nayak (2022)Khiladi (2022)Ghani (2022)

 Tamil cinema 
Old albums acquired
 1992 Thevar Magan 1992 Mannan 1992 Naalaya Seidhi 1993 Ejamaan 1993 Kalaignan 1993 Gentleman 1993 Kizhakku Cheemayile 1993 Uzhavan 1994 Magalir Mattum 1994 Vandicholai Chinraasu 1994 Duet 1994 Rasigan 1994 May Madham 1994 Pavithra 1994 Karuththamma 1994 Pudhiya Mannargal 1993 Bombay 1995 Aasai 1995 Muthu 1996 Love Birds 1996 Indian 1996 Mr. Romeo 1997 Iruvar 1997 Once More 1998 Udhavikku Varalaamaa 1998 Harichandra 1998 Pooveli 1999 En Swasa Kaatre 1999 Endrendrum Kadhal 1999 Padayappa 1999 Sangamam 1999 Poovellam KettupparNew albums
 2017 Theeran Adhigaaram Ondru 2019 Adithya Varma 2021 Kabadadaari 2022 Yutha Satham 2022 The Warriorr 2022 Prince 2023 Vaathi''

See also 
 Lists of record labels

References

External links 

Mass media companies of India
Music companies of India
Companies based in Hyderabad, India
Indian record labels
Indian music record labels
1993 establishments in Andhra Pradesh
Indian companies established in 1993